Charles "Sandy" Plunkett (born October 18, 1955) is an American artist and comics writer. He worked on several different series for Marvel Comics and DC Comics in the 1970s and 1980s.

Early life
Plunkett grew up in New York City and began to draw comics at the end of high school.

Career
He assisted the Crusty Bunkers at Neal Adams' Continuity Studios in the 1970s. Plunkett's first credited work was a one-page illustration in Savage Tales #11 (July 1975) published by Marvel Comics. He drew various short stories for Marvel, DC Comics, and Gold Key Comics over the next several years. Plunkett collaborated with writer Mike W. Barr on a Spider-Man/Scarlet Witch team-up story for Marvel Fanfare #6 (Jan. 1983). He worked on the New Universe titles as well as a Daredevil serial in Marvel Comics Presents. Plunkett has made his home in Athens, Ohio since 1990.

Bibliography

Dark Horse Comics
 Rocketeer Adventure Magazine #3 (1995)

DC Comics
 Batman: Legends of the Dark Knight #50 (one page) (1993)
 House of Mystery #253 (1977)
 Tom Strong's Terrific Tales #7 (2003)
 Unknown Soldier #210, 215 (1977–1978)
 Who's Who: The Definitive Directory of the DC Universe #8, 24 (1985–1987)

Gold Key Comics
 Boris Karloff Tales of Mystery #87, 91 (1978–1979)
 The Twilight Zone #67 (1975)

Heavy Metal
 Heavy Metal Special Editions #v13#1 (1999)

IDW Publishing
 Rocketeer Adventures #1 (2012)

Marvel Comics

 Codename: Spitfire #13 (1987)
 Conan the Barbarian #251 (1991)
 Defenders #53 (Clea backup story) (1977)
 Epic Illustrated #34 (1986)
 Justice #14 (1987)
 Marvel Comics Presents #69–72 (Daredevil); #131 (Ant-Man) (1991–1993)
 Marvel Fanfare #6 (Spider-Man and the Scarlet Witch); #42 (Captain Marvel); #45 (one page); #58 (Vision and the Scarlet Witch) (1983–1991)
 Nightmask #9 (1987)
 Official Handbook of the Marvel Universe #2, 4, 6, 9, 11 (1983)
 Official Handbook of the Marvel Universe Deluxe Edition #6–7, 9, 12, 14, 16, 18 (1986–1987)
 Savage Sword of Conan #188 (1991)
 Savage Tales #11 (one page) (1975)
 Solo Avengers #19 (Black Panther) (1989)
 Solomon Kane #6 (1986)

NBM Publishing
 Confessions of a Cereal Eater #1 (1995)

Swallow Press / Ohio University Press
 The World of a Wayward Comic Book Artist: The Private Sketchbooks of S. Plunkett (2010)

References

External links
 
Sandy Plunkett at the Unofficial Handbook of Marvel Comics Creators
Sandy Plunkett checklist

1955 births
American comics artists
American comics writers
Artists from Ohio
Comics colorists
Comics inkers
DC Comics people
Living people
Marvel Comics people
People from Athens, Ohio
Writers from Ohio